Princeton is an unincorporated community in Jackson County, Alabama, United States. Princeton is located on Alabama State Route 65 in the upper Paint Rock Valley. Skyline lies just over  miles to the east atop the Cumberland Plateau, and the Alabama–Tennessee state line passes several miles to the north.  Princeton has a post office with ZIP code 35766.

Notable people
 Henry Hollis Horton, Governor of Tennessee from 1927 to 1933
 Curly Putman, country music songwriter

References

External links

Unincorporated communities in Jackson County, Alabama
Unincorporated communities in Alabama